Wang Shijie (born 10 November 1963) is a Chinese athlete. He competed in the men's long jump at the 1984 Summer Olympics.

References

1963 births
Living people
Athletes (track and field) at the 1984 Summer Olympics
Chinese male long jumpers
Olympic athletes of China
Place of birth missing (living people)
20th-century Chinese people